Pierre Aubry (14 February 1874 in Paris – 31 August 1910 in Dieppe) was a French musicologist (according to professor of music and medieval studies, John Haines, Aubry was the first to use the term musicologie.) who specialized in secular monophony, musical palaeography and the music of the 13th century.

He is particularly known for applying the modal rhythms of Franconian theory to the repertoire trouvère and troubadour songs. The Alsatian scholar Johann-Baptist (later Jean-Baptist) Beck claimed plagiarism and Aubry called for a trial, which resulted in a judgment in Beck's favor. Aubry's premature death by suicide was shrouded in rumors of a duel, Beck himself believing the fatal stab wound was an accident while practicing for combat.


Selected publications
 (with Abbé E. Misset, about Adam of Saint Victor)
 Lais et descorts français du xiiie siècle] (1901)
Souvenir d'une mission d'études musicales en Arménie (1902)
Au Turkestan: note sur quelques habitudes musicales chez les Tadjiks et chez les Sartes (1905)
Un "explicit" en musique du roman de Fauvel (1906)
Le roman de Fauvel: reproduction photographique du manuscrit français 146 de la Bibliothèque Nationale de Paris (1907)
Cent motets du XIIIe siècle, publiés d'après le manuscrit Ed.IV.6 de Bamberg (1908)
Trouvères et troubadours] (1909, English translation 1914)
Le chansonnier de l'Arsenal (1910, with A. Jeanroy)

References

Further reading
Haines, John. "The 'Modal Theory', Fencing, and the Death of Pierre Aubry". Plainsong and Medieval Music 6 (1997): 143–150.

External links
Cent motets du XIIIe siècle publiés d'après le manuscrit Ed. IV. 6 de Bamberg par Pierre Aubry. I. Reproduction phototypique du manuscrit original
Cent motets du XIIIe siècle publiés d'après le manuscrit Ed. IV. 6 de Bamberg par Pierre Aubry. II. Transcription en notation moderne et mise en partition
Huit chants héroïques de l'ancienne France, XIIe–XVIIIe siècles; poems et musique recueillis et publiés avec notices historiques
Lais et descorts français du XIIIe siècle with Alfred Jeanroy 
Trouvères and troubadours, a popular treatise 
La rythmique musicale des troubadours et des trouvères 
Les plus anciens monuments de la musique française 
Les chansons de croisade with Joseph Bédier 

Writers from Paris
1874 births
1910 deaths
19th-century French musicologists
20th-century French musicologists
École Nationale des Chartes alumni
1910 suicides
Suicides by sharp instrument in France